Damase is a personal name, the French-language counterpart of Damasus.

Given name
 Damase Boulanger, founder of the city of Alma, Quebec
 Damase Bouvier (1929–1976), Canadian political figure
Damase Dufresne, Canadian politician
  (1842–1904), founder of Val-Jalbert, Quebec
 , French printer and publisher
 Damase Parizeau (1841–1913), Quebec farmer, carpenter, lumber merchant and political figure
 Damase Pierre-Louis (1894–1945), Haitian historian, statesman, author, journalist and diplomat
 Damase Potvin, Quebec writer and journalist
 Joseph-Damase Bégin (1900–1977), Quebec political figure
 Damase Racine (1855–1921), Canadian merchant and political figure
 Raymond Damase Ngollo (1936–2017), Congolese army officer

Surname
  (born 1930), French book publisher
 Jean-Michel Damase (1928–2013), French classical composer

See also
 Pope Damasus I (305–384)
 Pope Damasus II (died 1048)

Places
Saint-Damase, Quebec (disambiguation), several places

Food
Saint-Damase (cheese), a Canadian cheese